The Magritte Award for Best Supporting Actor is an award presented annually by the . It is given in honor of an actor who has delivered an outstanding performance in a supporting role while working within the film industry. It is one of the Magritte Awards, which were established to recognize excellence in Belgian cinematic achievements. 

The 1st Magritte Awards ceremony was held in 2011 with Jan Decleir receiving the award for his role in The Barons. As of the 2022 ceremony, Gilles Remiche is the most recent winner in this category for his role in Madly in Life.

Winners and nominees
In the list below, winners are listed first in the colored row, followed by the other nominees.

2010s

2020s

References

External links
 Magritte Awards official website
 Magritte Award for Best Supporting Actor at AlloCiné

Supporting Actor
Film awards for supporting actor